Backseat or back seat may refer to:

 a car seat located at the rear of a vehicle
 Backseat (band), Danish pop / rock group
 Backseat (album), a 1986 album by Finnish hard rock band Peer Günt
 "Backseat" (song), a 2011 single by the New Boyz featuring The Cataracs and Dev
"Backseat", a song by Charli XCX from the 2017 mixtape Pop 2
"Backseat", a song by K.A.R.D's BM and Somin

See also
 "Back Seat (of My Jeep)", a 1993 LL Cool J song from the album 14 Shots to the Dome
 "The Back Seat of My Car", a 1971 single release from the Paul McCartney album Ram
 Back-seat driver, a passenger in a vehicle who is not the driver that gives unwanted advice and/or criticism to the driver
 Back Seat Drivers, an Australian television program